Corporal Frederick John Knowles  (born 1895 in Nairn, Moray, Scotland; died 1979) was a Scottish World War I flying ace credited with seven aerial victories.

Military service
Knowles served in No. 111 Squadron in Palestine, part of 40th (Army) Wing, in the Egyptian Expeditionary Force during the Sinai and Palestine campaign. Between 12 December 1917 and 18 January 1918 while flying as observer/gunner to a number of pilots, he accounted for seven enemy aircraft, all but one destroyed.

Air Mechanic 2nd Class Knowles' award of the Military Medal was gazetted on 10 April 1918.

List of aerial victories

Confirmed victories are numbered and listed chronologically. Unconfirmed victories are denoted by "u/c" and may or may not be listed by date.

References
Citations

Bibliography
 

1895 births
Year of death missing
People from Nairn
Royal Flying Corps soldiers
British World War I flying aces
Scottish flying aces
Recipients of the Military Medal